The Nass River is a river in northern British Columbia, Canada.  It flows  from the Coast Mountains southwest to Nass Bay, a sidewater of Portland Inlet, which connects to the North Pacific Ocean via the Dixon Entrance. Nass Bay joins Portland Inlet just south of Observatory Inlet.

The English name "Nass" is derived from the Tlingit name Naas which means "intestines" or "guts" in reference to the river's large food capacity in its fish (Naish & Story 1963; Leer, Hitch, & Ritter 2001).  Can also be a Tlingit word for "food depot".  Former spellings are Naas and Nasse. The Nisga'a name for the river is K'alii Aksim Lisims "Lisims (river name) Valley". The Gitxsan name is Git-Txaemsim meaning People of Txeemsim (Raven or Trickster); Xsitxemsem in the dialect of the Gitanyow).  Lisims means "murky" in Nisga'a, referring to the river's silt-laden flow.

The last  of the river are navigable. The river is a commercially valuable salmon fishery. The basin of the Nass is the location of the first modern-day treaty settlement in British Columbia, between the government of that province and the Nisga'a Nation.

On the term:
Archdeacon W. H. Collison, an authority on this subject, and who has resided at Kincolith, Nass bay, since 1883, states as follows: - "The term Nass is from the Tlingit tongue, and when, as was probable, the Tlingits from Tongass, at the entrance to Observatory inlet, met Captain Vancouver they gave him their name for the river, i.e., Nass, which means literally "the stomach," from the fact that their food supplies of salmon, oolachan..
 a noted fishery."

History

The volcano has been active on at least two occasions (220 and 650 years ago) in the last millennium. Because of our knowledge of this previous disaster, modern monitoring techniques should include studies of the gases emitted by the volcanoes and the institution of a warning system to alert people living down slope from the volcanoes.

Hazards
If the Tseax Cone were to erupt again, there could be a repeat of the poisonous gas disaster that happened to the Nisga'a people 220 years ago. The eruption could also cause forest fires and could potentially dam local rivers such as the Nass River and the Tseax if the volume of the lava flows are large enough. If the lava flows were to again reach the Nass River, it could have disastrous short-term consequences for the important salmon fisheries on the Nass River system.

Tributaries
This is an incomplete list of tributaries, in upriver order:

 Xnukw (Iknouk River)
 Ksi Hlginx (Ishkheenickh River)
 Ksi Sii Aks (Tseax River)
 Ksi Gwinhat'al (Kwinatahl River)
 Tchitin River
 Kinskuch River
 Cranberry River
 Kiteen River
 White River
 Flat River
 Meziadin River, Meziadin Lake
 Bell-Irving River
 Kwinageese River
 Taylor River
 West Taylor River

See also
Nisga'a
Arrandale, British Columbia

References

Rivers of the North Coast of British Columbia
Nass Country
Rivers of the Boundary Ranges
Cassiar Land District
Range 5 Coast Land District
Rivers of British Columbia